Partners is the 34th studio album by country singer Willie Nelson.

Track listing
"Partners After All" (Bobby Emmons, Chips Moman)
"When I Dream" (Sandy Mason Therot)
"Hello Love, Goodbye" (Johnny Rodriguez) 
"Heart of Gold" (Neil Young)
"Kathleen" (Willie Nelson)
"Something" (George Harrison)
"So Much Like My Dad" (Emmons, Moman)
"My Own Peculiar Way" (Nelson)
"Remember Me (When the Candle Lights are Gleaming)" (Scott Wiseman)
"Home Away from Home" (Emmons)

Personnel
Willie Nelson - guitar, vocals
Chips Moman - guitar
J.R. Cobb - guitar, backing vocals
Reggie Young - guitar
Mike Leech - bass guitar, mandolin, arrangements
Bobby Emmons - keyboards
Bobby Wood - keyboards, backing vocals
Gene Chrisman - drums
Johnny Gimble - fiddle
Mickey Raphael - harmonica
The "A" Strings - strings
David Mayo, Paul Davis, Rebecca Evans Russell, Rick Yancey, Sam Shoup, Stephony Smith, Toni Wine - backing vocals

Chart performance

1986 albums
Willie Nelson albums
Albums produced by Chips Moman
Columbia Records albums